Hägersten-Liljeholmen is a borough (stadsdelsområde) in Stockholm, Sweden. It is part of the Söderort suburban area.

The borough is located in South Stockholm. The districts that make up the borough are Aspudden, Fruängen, Gröndal, Hägersten, Hägerstensåsen, Liljeholmen, Midsommarkransen, Mälarhöjden, Västberga, and Västertorp. The population of Hägersten-Liljeholmen borough is 83,283 as of 2014.

The borough was formed on January 1, 2007 by merging the Hägersten borough (Hägersten, Fruängen, Hägerstensåsen, Mälarhöjden and Västertorp) with Liljeholmen borough (Aspudden, Gröndal, Midsommarkransen, Västberga and a portion of Hägersten).

Demographic history 
 The population of the Liljeholmen borough in 2004 was 30,450 on an area of 6.83 km², giving it a density of 4,458/km².
 The population of Hägersten-Liljeholmen borough is 83,283 as of 2014.

Sports
The following sports clubs are located in Hägersten-Liljeholmen:
 IFK Aspudden-Tellus, based in Aspudden (IFK Tellus formerly based in Telefonplan)
 Hägersten SK, based in Hägerstensåsen
 Mälarhöjdens IK, based in Mälarhöjden
 Gröndals IK, based in Gröndal
 Kransen United FF, based in Midsommarkransen

People
 David Bielkheden, mixed martial artist, brought up in Hägersten
 John Martin Lindström, singer, brought up in Hägersten
 Stefano Catenacci, cook, brought up in Hägersten
 Lena Nilsson, actress, brought up in Fruängen
 Tomas Andersson Wij, musician, from Fruängen
 Aleks, singer, brought up in Fruängen
 Gunnel Fred, actress, from Fruängen
 Rolf Ridderwall, ice hockey goaltender, from Fruängen
 Fredde Granberg, actor, from Fruängen
 Ove Sundberg, from Fruängen
 Pontus Enhörning, from Fruängen
 Susanne Ljung, from Fruängen
 Lars Lundström, script writer, from Fruängen
 Salem Al Fakir, musician, lives in Fruängen
 Nanne Grönvall, singer, brought up in Västberga
 Melinda Wrede, journalist, brought up in Aspudden and Midsommarkransen
 Richard Wrede, rapper, brought up in Aspudden and Midsommarkransen
 Ison Glasgow, hip hop artist, brought up in Västertorp
 Jan-Ove Waldner, table tennis legend, has lived in Gulddragen near Västertorp
 Ara Abrahamian, wrestler, has lived in Västertorp
 Nabil Bahoui, footballer, brought up and lives in Gulddragen
 Jens Lapidus, author, brought up in Gröndal
 Lennart Askinger, footballer, brought up in Gröndal
 Roland Stoltz, ice hockey player, brought up in Gröndal
 Håkan Juholt, politician, lives in Västertorp
 Robyn, singer, lives in Liljeholmen
 Maria Lager, model, brought up in Hägersten
 Jonas Renkse, musician
 Quorthon,  musician
 Sarah Sjöström, swimmer
 Gideon Ståhlberg, chess grandmaster
 Daniel Breitholtz, A&R manager
 Martin Lidberg, wrestler
 Christoffer Röstlund Jonsson, musician
 Rafael Edholm, actor
 Maria Antoniou, actress
 Lisa Ekdahl, singer-songwriter
 Annika Hallin, actress
 Sofia Ledarp, actress
 Abir Al-Sahlani, politician
 Camilla Kvartoft, journalist
 Cecilia Uddén, journalist
 Johan Wiklander, ice hockey player

References

External links

Boroughs of Stockholm